The Daily Eastern News is the student-run newspaper published on the grounds of Eastern Illinois University serving the campus and community of Charleston, Illinois. The newspaper was founded on Nov. 5, 1915 and publishes on weekdays during the school year and online-only in the summer. It currently has a daily circulation of over 4,000.

The newspaper includes news, sports, features, opinions and special sections, as well as the weekly entertainment section "The Verge."

The paper's editorial, production, and advertising staff are composed entirely of students from a range of degree programs. The newspaper's faculty adviser is Lola Burnham.

The Daily Eastern News is printed adjacent to the newsroom on the university's Goss printing press. Eastern Illinois University is one of only three universities in the United States to run its own newspaper printing press and is one of the smallest universities in the country to have a daily newspaper.

The newspaper was founded on Nov. 5, 1915, as the Normal School News, as the university was then known as Eastern Illinois State Normal School. The paper was renamed Teacher's College News and Eastern State News before its current name was chosen in 1980.

Notable alumni of the newspaper include Bloomberg Businessweek reporter Cam Simpson, Associated Press national editor Chris Sundheim, and several Pulitzer Prize winners.

See also
 List of college and university student newspapers in the United States

References

External links
   The Daily Eastern News

Publications established in 1915
Student newspapers published in Illinois
1915 establishments in Illinois